Prairieview is an extinct town in Warren County, in the U.S. state of Missouri.

A post office called Prairieview was established in 1900, and remained in operation until 1903. The community's name most likely was illustrative of its setting.

References

Ghost towns in Missouri
Former populated places in Warren County, Missouri